Münchweiler may refer to:

Glan-Münchweiler, municipality in the district of Kusel, in Rhineland-Palatinate, Germany
Glan-Münchweiler (Verbandsgemeinde), collective municipality in the district of Kusel, Rhineland-Palatinate, Germany
Münchweiler am Klingbach, municipality in Südliche Weinstraße district, in Rhineland-Palatinate, western Germany
Münchweiler an der Alsenz, municipality in the Donnersbergkreis district, in Rhineland-Palatinate, Germany
Münchweiler an der Rodalb, municipality in Südwestpfalz district, in Rhineland-Palatinate, western Germany